Heartbreaker is a 2010 French romantic comedy film starring Romain Duris, Vanessa Paradis, Julie Ferrier and François Damiens.

Plot
The bulk of the story takes place in Monaco. Charming attractive Alex (Romain Duris), his sister Mélanie (Julie Ferrier), and her husband Marc (François Damiens), operate a unique business for concerned third-party clients—breaking up relationships, but only where the woman is "not knowingly unhappy." The trio concoct elaborate, custom, and sometimes expensive ruses to deceive the women. After each woman has fallen for his act, Alex tells her she has made him come alive again, but that it is too late for him. The women presumably leave their relationships to seek men who make them feel the way Alex has.

They are hired by a wealthy man (Jacques Frantz), who is a florist and gangster, to prevent the wedding of his daughter Juliette (Vanessa Paradis) to a wealthy Englishman of whom he does not approve, Jonathan (Andrew Lincoln). The main problem is that they only have ten days to do so before the wedding. The task is further complicated because, after doing a lot of research, the couple appear to be truly in love and absolutely perfect for each other. They also could not find the usual "flaws" in the couple that they use to cause break-ups. So, at first, Alex turns down the job, but, massively in debt to a loan shark through his own lavish spending on the business, he is pressured into putting aside his honourable principles to complete the seemingly impossible task with only five days until the wedding.

Alex becomes Juliette's 'bodyguard' in order to gain close and constant access to her. While on the job, Alex finds out things that Juliette likes and pretends to like these things as well to impress her; some of these things include the movie Dirty Dancing, Roquefort cheese and the music of George Michael. Eventually the two develop feelings for each other but the early arrival of Jonathan disrupts Alex's access to Juliette. The night before the wedding, Juliette is restless, and she and Alex sneak out and have a wonderful time, including recreating the 'climactic lift' scene from Dirty Dancing, and early the next morning Juliette confesses her feelings for him. Alex begins his usual script but, realising he cannot be with her after how he has deceived her, abruptly changes it and says she should get married.

The next day, as the group leave the hotel, Marc inadvertently drops Juliette's case file in front of her. Seeing the surveillance photos and her background information, she realizes her father has hired Alex to try to stop the wedding. At the airport Mélanie, after carefully observing the 'goings on' the last several days, chides Alex for walking away from real love to return to an empty life of fake seduction. He runs toward the wedding from the airport.

Meanwhile, Juliette's father tells her that while Jonathan is a decent man, she will be bored with him. As they are walking down the aisle, he tells her that Alex refused to take any payment for the contract. Before reaching the end of the aisle, Juliette turns and runs away from the ceremony to find Alex. The two meet and kiss after Alex confesses that he hates Roquefort and George Michael and had never seen Dirty Dancing, is broke and sleeps in his office, but he needs to see her every day.

As the end credits roll, back at the 'non-wedding', it is revealed that the loan shark to whom Alex owes money actually works for Juliette's father, while Juliette's scheming friend Sophie flirts with Jonathan. Later, Mélanie and Marc alone attempt another 'seduction', but Marc doesn't quite have Alex's charm to pull it off successfully.

Cast
 Romain Duris as Alex Lippi
 Vanessa Paradis as Juliette Van Der Becq
 Julie Ferrier as Mélanie
 François Damiens as Marc
 Andrew Lincoln as Jonathan
 Helena Noguerra as Sophie
 Jean-Yves Lafesse as Dutour
 Jacques Frantz as Van Der Becq
 Philippe Lacheau as The Boyfriend
 Audrey Lamy as The Cop
 Victoria Silvstedt makes a cameo as the lady in the blue Ferrari.

Reception
Since its release in France and other territories such as Belgium and the French-speaking region of Switzerland, the film has grossed €32.7 million (£26.8 million).

Review aggregation website Rotten Tomatoes reported an approval rating of 70%, based on 76 reviews, with an average score of 6.7/10. The site's consensus reads, "While definitely on the fluffier side of French comedy, Heartbreaker benefits from never taking itself too seriously -- and from the performance of the ever-charming Romain Duris.". At Metacritic, which assigns a normalized rating out of 100 to reviews from mainstream critics, the film received an average score of 59, based on 22 reviews, indicating "mixed or average reviews".

Accolades

US remake
Following the film's success in France it was announced that Working Title Films had acquired US remake rights.

References

External links
 
 
 Video Interview with Pascal Chaumeil and Romain Duris for Heartbreaker IONCinema

2010 films
2010 romantic comedy films
French romantic comedy films
2010s French-language films
Films set in Monaco
Films scored by Klaus Badelt
English-language French films
Films directed by Pascal Chaumeil
2010s French films